Alfred Grisar (22 July 1881 – 27 November 1958) was a Belgian polo player. He competed in the polo tournament at the 1920 Summer Olympics.

References

External links
 

1881 births
1958 deaths
Belgian polo players
Polo players at the 1920 Summer Olympics
Olympic polo players of Belgium
Sportspeople from Antwerp